Bhangar Assembly constituency is a Legislative Assembly constituency of South 24 Parganas district in the Indian State of West Bengal.

Overview
As per order of the Delimitation Commission in respect of the Delimitation of constituencies in the West Bengal, Bhangar Assembly constituency is composed of the following:
 Jagulgachhi, Narayanpur and Pranganj gram panchayats of Bhangar I community development block
 Bhangar II community development block

Bhangar Assembly constituency is a part of No. 22 Jadavpur (Lok Sabha constituency).

Members of Legislative Assembly

Election Results

2021
In the 2021 elections, Nawsad Siddique of ISF defeated his nearest rival Rezaul Karim of AITC.

2016

Legislative Assembly Election 2011

Legislative Assembly Elections 1977-2006
In 2006, Arabul Islam of AITC won the Bhangar Assembly constituency defeating his nearest rival Mosharaf Hossain Laskar of CPI(M). Badal Jamadar of CPI(M) defeated Abdus Sattar Molla of AITC in 2001, Azibar Rahaman of INC in 1996, and Nuzuzzaman Molla of INC in 1991. Abdur Razzak Molla of CPI(M) defeated Shaikh Shahidar Rahman of INC in 1987. Daud Khan of CPI(M) defeated Seriful Aslam Ishaque of INC in 1982 and Amir Ali Molla of Janata Party in 1977.

Legislative Assembly Elections 1952-1972
Abdur Razzak Molla of CPI(M) won in 1972. A.K.M Hassan Uzzaman, Independent politician, won in 1971. A.K.M.Ishaque of INC won in 1969. A.Molla of Bangla Congress won in 1967. A.K.M.Ishaque of INC won in 1962. Hem Chandra Naskar of INC won in 1957. In 1952, Bhangar Assembly constituency had joint seats. Hem Chandra Naskar of INC and Gangadhar Naskar of CPI, won.

References

Notes

Citations

Assembly constituencies of West Bengal
Politics of South 24 Parganas district